Clifford Emory "Pop" Horton (December 31, 1892 – April 14, 1981) was an American football, basketball, and baseball coach.  He was the ninth head football coach at Illinois State Normal University—now known as Illinois State University—in Normal, Illinois, serving for two seasons, from 1923 to 1934, and compiling a record of 4–8–4.

Horton graduated from Ohio Wesleyan University in Delaware, Ohio, where he participated in athletics.  He then attended the International YMCA College—now known as Springfield College—in Springfield, Massachusetts, earning a Bachelor of Physical Education degree.  Horton then did graduate work for a master's degree at Clark University in Worcester, Massachusetts, where he also coached baseball.  He founded the Gamma Phi Circus in 1929 as a gymnastics fraternity.  Horton retired from the university in August 1961.

Horton was born on December 31, 1892, in Shelton, Washington.  He married Garnetta E. Scheid on June 15, 1921, in Madison, Wisconsin.  Horton  died on April 14, 1981.

Head coaching record

Football

References

External links
 

1892 births
1981 deaths
Basketball coaches from Washington (state)
Illinois State Redbirds athletic directors
Illinois State Redbirds baseball coaches
Illinois State Redbirds football coaches
Illinois State Redbirds men's basketball coaches
Illinois State University faculty
Clark Cougars baseball coaches
Clark University alumni
Indiana University alumni
Ohio Wesleyan University alumni
Springfield College (Massachusetts) alumni
People from Shelton, Washington